Anna Svendsen (born 25 March 1990) is a Norwegian cross-country skier who represents Tromsø Ski Club. She made her World Cup debut in March 2012.

Svendsen is also a trained nurse.

Cross-country skiing results
All results are sourced from the International Ski Federation (FIS).

World Championships

World Cup

Season standings

Team podiums
 1 podium – (1 )

References

Norwegian female cross-country skiers
1990 births
Living people
Sportspeople from Tromsø